François Provost (1638 – 1 June 1702) was a career soldier from France who served in the Carignan-Salières regiment which was stationed to New France in 1665.

Provost was held in high esteem by Buade de Frontenac from early in his residency in Canada. He served as governor of Trois-Rivières, temporary Governor of Montreal and temporary governor of the country after the recall of Antoine Lefèbvre de La Barre.

References

External links 

People of New France
1638 births
1702 deaths
Governors of Montreal
17th-century Canadian politicians